Abū Turāb or Father of Dust, is a title attributed to Ali ibn Abi Talib, the fourth Muslim
Caliph, who is seen by twelver Imamiyah Shia as the first of their 12 Imams. According to authentic narrations the title "Abu Turab" Kunya (Arabic) was given to Ali ibn Abi Talib by Prophet Muhammad, when he found Ali sleeping while covered with dust.
The narration is present in Sahih Muslim Vol. 1. 
Ali bin Abi Talib was sleeping in a Mosque (Masjid) and his clothing was covered with dust, then Prophet Muhammad entered the Mosque and saw Ali lying asleep, and the Prophet said twice, "Get up, Abu Turab." The title "Abu Turab" recalls this moment.

Abu Turab means "Father of Soil/Dust". There is a verse in Quran that says,' Indeed, We have warned you of a near punishment on the Day when a man will observe what his hands have put forth and the disbeliever will say, "Oh, I wish that I were dust!" '

According to Vaglieri this title might have been given to him by his enemies, and fictitious narrations have emerged in the following centuries to give this title an honorable appearance.

The earliest non-islamic source where this nickname for ʿAli b. Abī Ṭālib appears is in George of Reshʿaina in 680 AD.

References

Works cited

See also
Ali
Ali in Muslim culture
Shia view of Ali
Sunni view of Ali
Arabic words and phrases
Ali